The Golden Sheaf Award for best Experimental production is presented by the Yorkton Film Festival.

History
In 1947 the Yorkton Film Council was founded.  The first Yorkton Film Festival was held in 1950  During the first few festivals, the films were adjudicated by audience participation through ballot casting and winners were awarded 'Certificates of Merit' by the film council.  In 1958 the film council established the Yorkton Film Festival Golden Sheaf Award for the category of 'Best of Festival', which was to be awarded to the best overall film of the festival.

In 1973 the Golden Sheaf Award for best Experimental was added to the main category of awards for the festival.   The winner of this award is determined by a panel of jurors chosen by the film council to select a film that best represents a filmmaker's expression using unconventional and innovative production practices and techniques.  This award is open to any genre.  As of 2020, the Golden Sheaf Award categories included: Main Entry Categories, Accompanying Categories, Craft Categories, and Special Awards.

Winners

1970s

1980s

1990s

2000s

2010s

2020s

References 

Awards established in 1973
Yorkton Film Festival awards